RFK Novi Sad 1921 (Serbian Cyrillic: РФК Нови Сад 1921) is a professional football club from Novi Sad, Serbia. The club is currently playing in the Serbian First League.

History
The club was founded in 1921 with the name NTK (Novosadski Trgovački Klub, Novi Sad Traders Club), and played in the regional leagues. In 1923, they won the local Novi Sad Football Subassociation league. In 1954, FK Eđšeg (named Jedinstvo) and FK Radnički (NTK) were merged into one club, renamed into RFK Novi Sad (Radnički Fudbalski Klub Novi Sad, Workers Football Club Novi Sad). The club moved to the stadium which was formerly of Jedinstvo and the yellow and blue colors were inspired by the pre-war club NAK Novi Sad.

Since then, the club started improving in the competition, and in 1961 they earned promotion to the Yugoslav First League. They played 3 seasons in the national highest level, with best Yugoslav teams coming to play to Detelinara Stadium. In their first top flight season they experienced difficulties and finished in 10th place out of 12 teams, avoiding relegation by only one spot. However, in 1962–63, their performance was much stronger and they finished in 8th in an expanded 14 teams competition in front of traditionally stronger teams such as Hajduk Split or their main city rivals, Vojvodina. However, in 1963–64 they finished 13th and by only one point they did not manage to avoid relegation. The competitiveness that season was so tough that at the end only 4 points separated the 7th-placed Vojvodina from the bottom team, 14th, FK Vardar. Ever since, RFK Novi Sad never managed again to play in the national top flight, playing mostly in the Yugoslav Second League during Yugoslav period.

After the dissolution of SFR Yugoslavia in 1991, RFK Novi Sad became the only club to play in 14 consecutive editions of the Second League of FR Yugoslavia. In 2006, they were relegated, however, after only one season, they were back to the, now renamed, Serbian First League. In 2011, the club celebrated its 90th birthday. In 2012, the club has changed its name in FK Novi Sad, but by 2014 the club's name was changed again to RFK Novi Sad 1921. In 2022 the club made a fusion with its neighbouring club FK Proleter Novi Sad to play in the Serbian First League.

Stadium

Club's stadium is located in Detelinara neighbourhood, in Novi Sad, and can hold up to 6,000 people, 2.008 of those seated.

Honours and achievements
 Yugoslav Second League East
 Winners: 1960–61
 Serbian League Vojvodina
 Winners: 2007

Notable players
List of current and former players with senior national team appearances:
  Ivica Brzić
  Aleksandar Kozlina
  Lazar Lemić
  Živan Ljukovčan
  Zoran Marić
  Josip Pirmajer
  Ljubiša Dunđerski
  Slaviša Jokanović
  Milan Jovanić
  Miodrag Pantelić
  Almir Memić
  Zlatomir Zagorčić
  Anto Grabo
  Predrag Bošnjak
  Slobodan Drapić
  Šaleta Kordić
  Milan Rakič
For the list of all current and former FK Novi Sad players with Wikipedia article, please see :Category:FK Novi Sad players.

Coaches
  Momčilo Raičević (2006–2008)
  Milan Kosanović (2008–2009)
  Dragan Radojičić (2009–2010)
  Zoran Govedarica (2010–2011)
  Josif Ilić (2011–2012)
  Bogdan Korak (September 2012 – February 2013)
  Zoran Janković (February 2013 – April 2013)
  Petar Bočković (XXXX – September 2018)
  Dejan Vuletić (September 2018 – October 2019)
  Mirko Babić (October 2019 – August 2020)
  Zoran Janković (August 2020 – 2020)
  Zoran Šaraba (October 2020 – XXXX)
  Petar Kurćubić (January 2021 – April 2021)
  Miroslav Gordanić (April 2021 – October 2021)
  Vladimir Šponja (October 2021 – June 2022)
  Aleksandar Radunović (June 2022–)

References

External links

 Results & Fixtures at Srbija Sport

 
Football clubs in Yugoslavia
Football clubs in Vojvodina
Football clubs in Novi Sad
Association football clubs established in 1921
1921 establishments in Serbia
2022 mergers and acquisitions